Just Between You and Me is the debut album of American country music duo The Kinleys. It was released in 1997 (see 1997 in country music) on Epic Records. The album produced four singles, all of which charted on the Billboard country singles charts. The first two — "Please" and the title track — were both Top Twenty hits, peaking at #7 and #12 respectively. Following these were "Dance in the Boat" and "You Make It Seem So Easy", at #49 and #48.

Track listing

Personnel

The Kinleys
Heather Kinley – lead and background vocals
Jennifer Kinley – lead and background vocals

Additional musicians
Eddie Bayers – drums
Mark Casstevens – acoustic guitar
Larry Franklin – fiddle
Shannon Forrest – drums
Sonny Garrish – steel guitar
Anthony Martin – background vocals
Brent Mason – electric guitar
Terry McMillan – percussion
Stan Munsey – keyboards
Steve Nathan – keyboards
Larry Paxton – bass guitar
Michael Rhodes – bass guitar
Brent Rowan – electric guitar
Mitchell Shedd – percussion
Biff Watson – acoustic guitar
John Willis – acoustic guitar

Charts

Weekly charts

Year-end charts

References

1997 debut albums
Epic Records albums
The Kinleys albums